Live in Australia with the Melbourne Symphony Orchestra, released in 1987, is the twenty-eighth official album release for English musician Elton John. It is a live album recorded at the Sydney Entertainment Centre on 14 December 1986 with the Melbourne Symphony Orchestra.

Album history
The concert, recorded on 14 December 1986, was the last of a series of concerts done throughout the last two months of 1986, which were part of John's Tour De Force of Australia and New Zealand. The concerts consisted of two sets: the first was limited to John and his 14-piece band, including backing vocalists and the Onward International horn section, and his flamboyant stage dress, featuring Mohawk and Tina Turner wigs and some outlandish eyewear; the second featured John, the band and the 88-piece Melbourne Symphony Orchestra, with him dressed as Mozart.

John's band was essentially the lineup used on Leather Jackets, which he was touring behind at the time, including Jody Linscott and special guest Ray Cooper, both of whom played percussion.

James Newton Howard, who had previously played keyboards in John's band during 1975-1976 and was at the time an up-and-coming film composer in Hollywood, joined John to conduct and write larger, augmented charts of not only his own previous work on "Tonight," but also Paul Buckmaster's original arrangements, since the music was to be played by 88 musicians, instead of the smaller studio orchestra for which the compositions were originally designed. He also wrote brand new full orchestra parts for songs such as "Don't Let the Sun Go Down on Me", which previously only had a horn arrangement.

The album features most of the songs recorded in the second half of the show, excluding "Saturday Night's Alright for Fighting", "Carla/Etude", "Cold as Christmas (In the Middle of the Year)" and "Slow Rivers", which was sung by John alone (John dueted "Slow Rivers" with Cliff Richard on Leather Jackets).

John's live sound engineer, Clive Franks, handled the recording of the band (assisted by Keith Walker and Dennis Fox), while album producer Gus Dudgeon supervised recording of the orchestra by Leon Minervini and Nic Jeremy. Dudgeon took the tapes back to Wisseloord Studios in the Netherlands for mixing with engineer Graham Dickson, who had also worked on Leather Jackets.

This concert was the last to feature Elton's legendary stage costumes, which he had featured in his shows since the early 1970s.  It was also his last show before undergoing throat surgery in January 1987. Despite being completely successful, the surgery prevented Elton from singing and touring for several months and permanently altered his voice.

Track listing
All songs written by Elton John and Bernie Taupin.

"Sixty Years On" – 5:41
"I Need You to Turn To" – 3:14
"The Greatest Discovery" – 4:09
"Tonight" – 5:58
"Sorry Seems to Be the Hardest Word" – 3:58
"The King Must Die" – 5:21
"Take Me to the Pilot" – 4:22
"Tiny Dancer" – 7:46
"Have Mercy on the Criminal" – 5:50
"Madman Across the Water" – 6:38
"Candle in the Wind" – 4:10
"Burn Down the Mission" – 5:49
"Your Song" – 4:04
"Don't Let the Sun Go Down on Me" – 6:06

Six of the fourteen songs originally appeared on the 1970 studio album Elton John (tracks 1, 2, 3, 6, 7 & 13).

Laserdisc edition
Side 1 (Elton and His Band)
 "Funeral for a Friend"
 "One Horse Town"
 "Rocket Man"
 "The Bitch Is Back"
 "Daniel"
 "Song For You"
 "Blue Eyes"
 "I Guess That's Why They Call It the Blues"
 "Bennie and the Jets"
 "Sad Songs"
 "I'm Still Standing"

Side 2 (Elton and Orchestra)
 "Sixty Years On"
 "I Need You to Turn To"
 "Sorry Seems to Be the Hardest Word"
 "Take Me to the Pilot"
 "Don't Let the Sun Go Down on Me"
 "Candle in the Wind"
 "Burn Down The Mission"
 "Your Song"
 "Saturday Night's Alright for Fighting"

Releases
In the US, it was certified gold in January 1988 and platinum in October 1995 by the RIAA.

A home video release commemorated the concert and was originally released on both laserdisc and VHS. Both editions included most of the "Elton & His Band" portion of the show (except "Heartache All Over The World" and "This Town"), but omitted several songs in the symphony orchestra portion ("The Greatest Discovery", "Tonight", "The King Must Die", "Cold as Christmas", "Carla/Etude", "Tiny Dancer", "Have Mercy on the Criminal", "Slow Rivers", and "Madman Across the Water".) A version of the Laserdisc program has surfaced on DVD. 
In terms of audio, the "Elton & His Band" portion, "Daniel" and "Medley: Song for You, Blue Eyes, I Guess That's Why They Call It the Blues" were issued in 1988 as bonus tracks on the Rocket Records maxi-single for "A Word in Spanish" (UK/Europe only) as EJSCD 18, 872 299-2. The audio from "Carla/Etude" from the concert appeared on the To Be Continued... boxed set.

CD editions
The running time of the original 1987 US CD release on MCA Records (MCAD-8022) is 73:58, whilst the 1998 remastered CD edition on Mercury/Island Records (314 558 477-2) runs only 73:48. The missing time is due to the removal of several seconds of applause following the song "Tonight".

The track listing for both editions is the same. However, the running time of most of the remastered tracks vary from the original release due to a different placement of the track marks between songs. In many cases, the track mark changes move a song's spoken introduction from the beginning of the track to the end of the preceding track.

Personnel
Produced by Gus Dudgeon
Mastered by Greg Fulginiti US
Elton John – piano, vocals
Davey Johnstone – guitars
David Paton – bass guitar
Charlie Morgan – drums
Fred Mandel – keyboards, synthesizers
Ray Cooper – percussion
Jody Linscott – percussion
Alan Carvell – backing vocals
Gordon Neville – backing vocals
Shirley Lewis – backing vocals
James Newton Howard – orchestral arrangements, conductor
Melbourne Symphony Orchestra

Certifications and sales

References

https://web.archive.org/web/20070630170447/http://www.vex.net/~paulmac/elton/ej1987.html#1987

Albums produced by Gus Dudgeon
1987 live albums
Elton John video albums
Elton John live albums
Live video albums
1987 video albums
The Rocket Record Company live albums
The Rocket Record Company video albums
Collaborative albums
Melbourne Symphony Orchestra albums